Under This Old Hat is an album released by American country music artist Chris LeDoux. Overall, it is his 25th album and his third for Liberty Records. "Under This Old Hat", "Every Time I Roll the Dice", and "For Your Love" were released as singles from 1993 to 1994. The album peaked at #21 on the Billboard Top Country Albums chart.

Content
The song, "Every Time I Roll the Dice" was recorded the previous year (1992) by Delbert McClinton on his album, Never Been Rocked Enough and would later be covered by many other country acts. "For Your Love" was written by Joe Ely and first appeared on his 1988 album, Dig All Night. The self-penned, "Wild and Wooly" was originally recorded in 1986 for LeDoux's album of the same name while "Even Cowboys Like a Little Rock & Roll" was first recorded for 1984's Melodies and Memories. A dance club mix of the song "Cadillac Ranch" was included as a bonus track.

Track listing

Personnel
As listed in liner notes
Gary Bodily - bass guitar
Charlie Daniels - background vocals
Dan Dugmore - steel guitar
Rob Hajacos - fiddle
Bobby Jensen - keyboards
Chris LeDoux - lead and background vocals, acoustic guitar, harmonica
Brent Rowan - acoustic guitar, electric guitar
Mark Sissel - electric guitar
K.W. Turnbow - drums
Curtis Young - background vocals
Jonathan Yudkin - fiddle

Chart performance

Sources

CMT
Allmusic
AOL Music

1993 albums
Chris LeDoux albums
Liberty Records albums
Albums produced by Jimmy Bowen
Albums produced by Jerry Crutchfield